The biathlon competition at the 2010 Winter Olympics were held at Whistler Olympic Park in Whistler, British Columbia. The events were held between the 13th and 26 February 2010.

The men's individual biathlon was notable for the awarding of two silver medals due to two competitors finishing with a tie (48:32.0). No bronze medal was awarded in this event.

Medal summary

Medal table

Men's events

Women's events

Events 
A total of ten biathlon events were held at Vancouver 2010:

Competition schedule 
All times are Pacific Standard Time (UTC-8).

Qualification

Athlete quotas 
Athlete quotas: 220 athletes (113 men, 107 women)
A NOC may enter no more than 12 athletes (6 men and 6 women), and no more than 4 athletes per event.

Quotas by events:
 Individual: 88 (men's), 87 (women's)
 Sprint: 88 (men's), 87 (women's)
 Pursuit: 60 athletes1
 Mass start: 30 athletes
 Relay: 20 teams (80 athletes)
1Qualification to the pursuit is based on results from the sprint

Eligibility criteria 
All competitors must comply with one of the three minimum qualifications standards set forward by the IBU:
 The athlete must have achieved a time that is less than 20% higher than the average time of the top 3 during a sprint or individual in the European Cup (IBU Cup), including the European championships, during the 2010/2009 or the 2009/2008 season.
or 
 The athlete must achieve a top-half finish in the 2010 or 2009 World Junior Championships.
or
 The athlete must have participated in a Biathlon world cup or world championships during the 2008/2009 or 2009/2010 season.
 All members of a relay team must comply with those criteria.

Additionally, only athletes representing an NOC that is recognized by the IOC and member of the IBU can participate in the games.

Qualification criteria 
All 220 quota places will be awarded using a point ranking combining the 2008 and 2009 Biathlon World Championships.

Men's
 Rank 1 to 5: six athletes
 Rank 6 to 20: five athletes
 Rank 21 to 28: one athlete

Women's
 Rank 1 to 5: six athletes
 Rank 6 to 15: five athletes
 Rank 16 to 20: four athletes
 Rank 21 to 27: one athlete

Participating nations 
According to final report by VANOC these were the final participation numbers:

Rejected quota places: Finland earned five spots in both genders, but decided to send only two men and two women. Poland qualified 5 men, but sent only two men. Slovenia had earned 5 spots each, but decided to send only four women and men. Great Britain (women), Belgium (men), the Netherlands (men), and Austria (women) rejected their single spots earned in either men's or women's. Greenland has no NOC, so Greenland's spot earned in men's competition was used by Denmark.

References

See also 

 Biathlon at the 2010 Winter Paralympics

 
2010
2010 Winter Olympics events
Winter Olympics
Biathlon competitions in Canada